The orbicular batfish (Platax orbicularis), also known as the circular batfish, orbiculate batfish, round batfish, or orbic batfish is a popular aquarium fish which occurs naturally in the tropical waters of the Indian and Pacific Oceans. These fishes are sought after for their high prize by nearby pacific communities as they are known for their high-quality meat.

Description
The body of Platax orbicularis is almost disc-shaped, and very thin. Its tail, about 20% of the body length, is fan-shaped and is taller than it is long.

Distribution
In the wild, the orbicular batfish is found in brackish or marine waters, usually around reefs, at depths from 5 to 30 meters. Its range extends from the Red Sea and East Africa in the east to the Tuamotu Islands in French Polynesia in the west, and from southern Japan in the north to northern Australia and New Caledonia.  It has been recorded off the coast of Florida, though this may be the result of dumping of aquarium specimens.

Juvenile fish are solitary or live in small groups, among mangroves or other inner sheltered lagoons.  Adults are found in more open waters and at greater depth.

References

External links
 

Ephippidae
Fish of Palau
Fish described in 1775
Taxa named by Peter Forsskål